Gledi Mici (born 6 February 1991) is an Albanian professional footballer who plays as a left-back for Kosovan club Prishtina.

Club career

Kukësi
On 4 January 2015, Mici declared that he had terminated his contract with Flamurtari through mutual consent and had joined the league leaders Kukësi as a free agent. He made his debut for the club twenty days later in a 2–1 away win against Vllaznia Shkodër, where he started the game at left-back and played the full 90 minutes. Mici made 11 league appearances during the second half of the campaign as his new side finished runner-up in the Kategoria Superiore. In the Albanian Cup he made 5 appearances for the club, as they reached the final against Laçi, where Mici played the full game in the 2–1 loss.

On 4 August 2016, Mici expressed his intention to leave the club by posting a status in his Facebook account, accusing the club for injustice against him. The player wanted to terminate his contract with the club and to do that he send the case to the Albanian Football Association's Disciplinary Committee. However, he was included in the list of the preparation phrase in Ohrid, He also accused the club president Safet Gjici for "making an unfair contract with him". Following that, Gjici said that it was worthless to keep Mici on the team, adding that he was transfer listed.

Skënderbeu Korçë

2016–17 season

On 16 August 2016, Mici completed a move to Skënderbeu Korçë for €30,000 and signing a contract until 2018. He made his league debut for the club on 7 September 2016 in a 2–1 home win against his former club Flamurtari.

2017–18 season
During the 2017–18 season, Mici helped Skënderbeu to qualify at Group B of UEFA Europa League group stage, where he featured in all the games. He also helped Skënderbeu Korçë win their 8th Kategoria Superiore trophy. He opted to leave the club at the end of the season, however, after UEFA announced they banned Skënderbeu Korçë from all UEFA competition for 10 years due to match-fixing.

Shkëndija
On 21 July 2018, Mici signed a two-year contract with Macedonian First Football League club Shkëndija. Eighteen days later, he made his debut with Shkëndija in the 2018–19 UEFA Champions League third qualifying round against the Austrian side Red Bull Salzburg after coming on as a substitute at 77th minute in place of Mevlan Murati.

Prishtina
On 10 September 2020, Mici joined Football Superleague of Kosovo side Prishtina. Nine days later, he made his debut against Drenica after being named in the starting line-up and assists in his side's first goal during a 3–0 home win. On 3 June 2021, after he helped Prishtina win the title, he signed a 3 year extension.

International career

Mici represented Albania U17 at 2008 UEFA European Under-17 Championship qualifying round and played in all three games as a starter. On 31 May 2021, the Football Federation of Kosovo announced that Mici has decided to represent their national team and received call-up for the friendly matches against Guinea and Gambia, but a day later the Football Federation of Kosovo confirmed that he and his three Prishtina teammates who were called up for these matches will not be part of the national team following the club's request to release them from the squad in order to be as fresh as possible for the 2021–22 UEFA Champions League preliminary round matches.

Personal life
Mici was born in Albania's capital city Tirana to Albanian parents from Fier. In addition to the Albanian passport, he also has United States passport and is in the process of obtaining Kosovan passport.

Career statistics

Honours

Club
Flamurtari
Albanian Cup: 2013–14

Kukësi
Albanian Cup: 2015–16

Skënderbeu Korçë
Kategoria Superiore: 2017–18
Albanian Cup: 2017–18

Shkëndija
Macedonian First Football League: 2018–19

Prishtina
Kosovar Supercup: 2020
Football Superleague of Kosovo: 2020–21

Individual
Kategoria Superiore Talent of the Season: 2012–13

References

External links

1991 births
Living people
Footballers from Tirana
Albanian footballers
Albania youth international footballers
Kosovan footballers
Association football fullbacks
People with acquired Kosovan citizenship
Naturalised citizens of Kosovo
Kosovan expatriate footballers
Kosovan expatriate sportspeople in Albania
Kosovan expatriate sportspeople in North Macedonia
Albanian expatriate footballers
Albanian expatriate sportspeople in North Macedonia
Albanian expatriate sportspeople in Kosovo
Kategoria Superiore players
KF Tirana players
KF Apolonia Fier players
FC Kamza players
Flamurtari Vlorë players
FK Kukësi players
KF Skënderbeu Korçë players
Macedonian First Football League players
KF Shkëndija players
Football Superleague of Kosovo players
FC Prishtina players